Name-ye Khosrowan (The Book of Khosrows/Kings) is a historical book written by the Qajar prince, Jalal al-Din Mirza Qajar between 1868 and 1872 CE. Name-ye Khosrowan includes history of Iran, from the ancient times to the Zand dynasty.

References 

Iranian nationalism
Iranian books

Linguistic purism in Persian
Qajar Iran